Holton Le Moor railway station was a station in Holton le Moor, Lincolnshire, England. It was opened in 1848 and closed in 1965.

References

Disused railway stations in Lincolnshire
Railway stations in Great Britain opened in 1848
Railway stations in Great Britain closed in 1965
Former Great Central Railway stations